Xanthoparmelia ahtii is a rock shield lichen which belongs to the Xanthoparmelia genus, the former taxon for this species was Neofuscelia ahtii. The lichen is uncommon and is listed as imperiled by the Nature Conservatory.

Description 
Grows on rocks and is olive brown to yellow or reddish brown in color. Lobes are approximately 1-2.5 mm wide and are slightly curved and broad.

Habitat and range 
Found in the North American southwest growing on rocks. It has been observed in forested areas in the state of Arizona as well as well as the Mexican state of Baja California Sur.

See also 

 List of Xanthoparmelia species

References 

ahtii
Lichen species
Lichens of North America